Eugenia praestigiosa is a species of plant in the family Myrtaceae. It is endemic to Peninsular Malaysia.

References

praestigiosa
Endemic flora of Peninsular Malaysia
Data deficient plants
Taxonomy articles created by Polbot